Barbie, a fashion doll manufactured by American toy and entertainment company Mattel, has been featured in an eponymous media franchise since the late 1980s. This franchise encompasses a CGI/computer-animated film series that later expanded to other productions and media formats. Referred to among fans as the "Barbie Cinematic Universe", it has become one of the highest-grossing media franchises of all time. The film series aired regularly on Nickelodeon in the United States from 2002 until 2017 where they moved over to streaming services like Netflix, Google Play and Apple TV+. The films revamped into streaming television films 3 years later, which are marketed by Mattel as "specials" and picked up for television broadcast in multiple countries and regions/territories.

Since Barbie's debut on March 9, 1959, the franchise not only produced the flagship components of dolls with their clothes and accessories, but also a large range of branded goods such as books, comic books and video games. The franchise began with the release of two animated TV specials in 1987; Barbie and the Rockers: Out of This World and its sequel. It later began the film series in 2001 with the direct-to-video release of its first feature-length film,  Barbie in the Nutcracker. The film series made its American television debut on Nickelodeon in 2002 with its second film, Barbie as Rapunzel. For the following 1½ decades or 15 years, the films were released both on home video formats and as TV specials on Nickelodeon. The 35th release, Barbie: Video Game Hero in 2017, marked the last time a Barbie film both aired on American television and released on home video formats. Since 2012, the franchise has since expanded to include web series like Barbie: Life in the Dreamhouse, Barbie: Vlogger, and Barbie: Dreamtopia, television shows like Barbie: Dreamhouse Adventures and Barbie: It Takes Two, a live-action film to be released on 21 July 2023 and an interactive short film with the release of Barbie: Epic Road Trip in 2022.

In response to a growing rise of digital and interactive media (as well as the gradual decline of dolls, toys and accessories) in the 1980s, Mattel adapted Barbie into various facets of media and entertainment beyond the television advertisement of its dolls and related accessories (which was a prolific marketing strategy in the past) including computer-animated films, television shows, web series, theatrical events, soundtrack albums and streaming media content. In the films, Barbie is featured as a virtual actress playing the main character, and often being portrayed as a modern girl telling the story to one of her sisters or a younger friend – as a parable to present affairs. Scholars examining how the Barbie films differ from other princess narratives have concluded that Mattel intentionally attempted to remediate its brand based on feminist criticisms through storytelling in the films.

Origins
The net popularity of the Barbie fashion doll on the toy market began to decline in the 1980s, and struggled further in 2001 when MGA Entertainment introduced a line of dolls under the name Bratz, whose sexualized characters contrasted with Barbie's older, chaste image. Mattel therefore attempted to overhaul the Barbie brand to keep the toy relevant to consumers in the modern age by bringing in consultants and conducting research on key market groups. Mattel consultants initially considered reducing the Barbie's breast size, but later claimed that the doll's figure could not be changed because "being consistent is one of her biggest strengths". This move might also have been rejected because of the success of MGA's sexualized Bratz dolls. Mattel's team also considered targeting market audiences of career women and their daughters by introducing lines of Doctor or Lawyer Barbies. However, Mattel's research showed that girls were spending more time online than playing with physical dolls. Therefore, targeted career Barbies were discarded in favor of looking for more interactive platforms through online or digital media.

History
In 1987, Mattel produced two television specials with DIC Animation City and Saban Productions; Barbie and the Rockers: Out of This World and its sequel Barbie and the Sensations: Rockin' Back to Earth, both featuring Barbie as the leader of a rock band. Between the 1980s and early 2000s, Barbie got featured in video games, many of which were distributed by Vivendi-Universal Games. With the boom of home video marketing at the time, Mattel launched an eponymous in-house entertainment division in 2001 and began the creation of the Barbie films with the direct-to-video release of Barbie in the Nutcracker. The films initially revolved around Barbie being re-imagined as a princess and eventually expanded into various worlds of fashion and fantasy. A primary benefit of this strategy revolved around marketing, as Mattel could sell dolls specific to each film separately from the video sales and merchandise related to props, costumes, and sets from the films.

Tim Kilpin, then-senior vice-president for girls marketing at Mattel, stated: "What you see now are several different Barbie worlds anchored by content and storytelling. A girl can understand what role Barbie is playing, what the other characters are doing, and how they interrelate. That's a much richer level of story that leads to a richer level of play." The strategy worked as U.S. Barbie sales, led by the princess line, "increased by two percent in 2006, saving Mattel's bottom line at a time when its worldwide share of the toy market was declining." Within the films, Mattel included performances by well-known companies and orchestras, such as the London Symphony Orchestra, the Czech Philharmonic and the New York City Ballet. These associations could have been included as an enrichment strategy on behalf of Mattel's marketing team, to help the films be seen as educational.

In the midst of the films, Canadian animation studio, Arc Productions, Inc., which was just renamed from Starz Animation Toronto (originally Daniel Krech Productions (DKP) and DKP Studios) and had new-consortium ownership and structural revamp, produced the first non-Barbie-film production for Mattel in 2011, a web series called Barbie: Life in the Dreamhouse which debuted on the official Barbie website and YouTube on 11 January 2012 and concluded on 27 November 2015. The web series later spawned two television specials which were broadcast in the U.S. on Nickelodeon. Impressed, Mattel gave them four Barbie films to produce while enlisting them as the third production partner after Mainframe Studios (at the time known as "Rainmaker Entertainment") and Technicolor.

Israeli animation studio, Snowball Studios, with support from the Jerusalem Film and Television Fund, produced another web series, this time created by Nickelodeon alum Julia Pistor, for Mattel Playground Productions known as Barbie: Dreamtopia. This series of 2-minute to 4-minute shorts launched on 21 May 2016 by Mattel's then-latest division, Mattel Creations, on a YouTube affiliate platform known as YouTube Kids. The web shorts series later spawned an eponymous television film (distributed by Universal Pictures Home Entertainment and was broadcast on television in over 5 countries and regions/territories), one web-based special and a 26-episode web series – therefore invoking the first web-exclusive Barbie media franchise. This would be the catalyst for scholars and enthusiasts alike to notice Mattel heavily invested and involved in releasing more related Barbie web series and miniseries bundles on YouTube and its variants; YouTube Kids and YouTube Shorts.

Through the short video bundles on YouTube, Mattel also provided a platform for Barbie to give its audience a look into her fictional life while trying to educate them along the way. With a YouTube channel having over 11 million subscribers, Mattel introduced Barbie as a YouTuber through a web series called Barbie Vlogger (or Barbie Vlogs), uploading its first video on 19 June 2015. Julia Pistor, who was also the executive producer and writer of the series, stated: "Barbie is conscious of language and words; she talks about intention and she’s self-reflective. While we might use words that kids sometimes need to look up, we try to be true to Barbie being a 17-year-old influencer."  By giving a self-reflective nature to Barbie's character, this would allow her to discuss difficult topics (such as mental health and racism) in such a way that it inspires its audience to think about and discuss those topics as well.

With the success of its online platforms, Mattel would continue to produce web series and mini-series on YouTube and its variants. On the other hand, the media franchise as a whole has moved over to streaming services, primarily on Netflix but also including Amazon Prime Video, Google Play and Apple TV+, beginning with Barbie: Dolphin Magic in 2017. In addition, Mattel signed an agreement on 1 May 2020 with Arts Music, Inc., a then-newest record label of Warner Music Group, to make thousands of songs from their brand portfolio – including Barbie –  available through online music streaming services. The agreement began taking effect a week later when the soundtrack albums tied to their related productions are made available through WMG's distribution label, ADA Worldwide. Mattel would extend its partnership with Netflix on 21 October 2022, 4 days before the American debut of the franchise's inaugural interactive "special", Barbie: Epic Road Trip, which would also see the pre-2017 film catalogue previously held by Universal made available through the streaming service.

Films

Mattel partnered with Canadian company, Mainframe Entertainment, (currently Mainframe Studios) to produce its first computer-animated feature-length film, Barbie in the Nutcracker, based on E. T. A. Hoffmann's classic tale and Tchaikovsky's accompanying ballet music, which was released in 2001. Mainframe continued to produce the majority of the future films in the series. The first decade was dominated by films based on pre-existing stories, including Brothers Grimm's fairy tales: Rapunzel and The Twelve Dancing Princesses, Tchaikovsky's Swan Lake ballet, Charles Dickens' A Christmas Carol, Hans Christian Andersen's Thumbelina and Alexandre Dumas' The Three Musketeers. Due to the popularity of the 2004 film Barbie as the Princess and the Pauper (based on Mark Twain's famous novel), a remake was released in 2012 entitled Barbie: The Princess & the Popstar, which itself inspired two films with a more modern look: Barbie in Rock 'N Royals in 2015 and Barbie: Princess Adventure in 2020.

The success of the first three films (namely, Barbie in the Nutcracker, Barbie as Rapunzel, and Barbie of Swan Lake) had led to the princess-themed lineup in the series, releasing its original princess film Barbie and the Magic of Pegasus in 2005. Before that film's release, Barbie: Fairytopia, was released the first original film in the franchise and spawned the first-in-series franchise made up of two sequels (Barbie Fairytopia: Mermaidia in 2006 and Barbie Fairytopia: Magic of the Rainbow in 2007) and two spin-offs (Barbie: Mariposa in 2008 and its sequel, Barbie: Mariposa & the Fairy Princess, in 2013).

Starting with Barbie in A Mermaid Tale in early 2010, the film series moved away from the classic princess and fairy stories to focus on more modern themes like fashion, music, and on stories revolving around Barbie's friends, family and careers. In 2017, the film series was put on hiatus after Barbie: Dolphin Magic, which served as the pilot to the inaugural television show in the franchise, Barbie: Dreamhouse Adventures, in Mattel's attempt to focus on expanding the franchise to other audiovisual media formats. Mattel later revamped the films in 2020 as animated "specials", beginning with the musical, Barbie: Princess Adventure, all of which fall under the "Dreamhouse Adventures" canon.

Below is the full official computer-animated film franchise:

Live-action film

A live-action adaptation of the toy line from Mattel Films in association with LuckyChap Entertainment and Heyday Films is currently awaiting its American theatrical debut on 21 July 2023 by Warner Bros. having wrapped on 15 July 2022. The film was directed by Greta Gerwig who co-wrote the screenplay with Noah Baumbach and stars an ensemble cast led by Margot Robbie as Barbie and Ryan Gosling as Ken.

Animated specials
Before the films and the video games, Mattel released two animated television specials in 1987. The specials returned on 1 February 2023, this time on YouTube, to complement a doll line exclusively aimed at preschoolers, a new territory for the Barbie media franchise.

 Barbie and the Rockers: Out of This World, a 1987 animated TV special created by DIC Animation City with Saban Productions and featuring Barbie as the leader of a rock band. It is supposedly the pilot to a daily Barbie cartoon series that was cancelled in 1988.
 Barbie and the Sensations: Rockin' Back to Earth, a 1987 sequel to Barbie and the Rockers: Out of This World, where Barbie and her band return from space only to end up in the 1950s.
 My First Barbie: Happy Dreamday, a 40-minute musical animated special produced by Canada-based Kickstart Entertainment and released on 1 February 2023 on YouTube, featuring Barbie and her friends as they prepare for a surprise party.

Animated series
Mattel has released several animated television shows, web series and miniseries since 2012 which include as follows:
 Barbie: Life in the Dreamhouse, a YouTube-exclusive web series aired between 10 January 2012 and 27 November 2015 with 75 episodes (including two TV specials which aired in the United States on Nickelodeon).
 Barbie: Motion Comics, a web-based animated motion comic series released between 5 August and 18 October 2015 on YouTube and is composed of miniseries, namely: Be Super (inspired by Barbie in Princess Power), Raise Your Voice (inspired by Barbie in Rock 'N Royals), and Puppy Adventures (inspired by Barbie & Her Sisters in The Great Puppy Adventure).
 Barbie Vlogger or Barbie Vlogs, a YouTube-exclusive CGI-animated sequences that began on 19 June 2015 and featuring Barbie as a vlogger either by herself or along with one or more of her family and friends.
 Barbie: Dreamtopia, a web-exclusive franchise that began in January 2016 with a release of 2-minute to 4-minute shorts on YouTube. It then spawned one 44-minute TV special (which aired on television in 5 countries/regions/territories), one web-based special and an initially-exclusive YouTube Kids series with 26 episodes. The latter was made available later on YouTube from 5 November 2017 to 1 April 2018 and aired as an actual TV series in over 6 countries.
 Barbie: Dreamhouse Adventures, the inaugural TV series in the franchise released between 3 May 2018 and 12 April 2020 on Netflix in the U.S. It consisted of 52 episodes over 5 "season" episode bundles and aired as an actual TV series in over 8 countries.
 Barbie's Dreamworld, a YouTube-exclusive web series franchise created by Ireland-based Relish Studios that began on 25 January 2021 and is composed of several different miniseries, including Barbie: Return to Dreamtopia and Barbie and the Nutcracker among others.
 Barbie: It Takes Two, the second TV series in the franchise released in two installments on Netflix in the United States; 13 episodes on April 8 and another 13 on 1 October, both in 2022. Released as the television format follow-up to the film released before it, Barbie: Big City, Big Dreams, the series debuted on Australian television via 9Go! and later aired on television in over 4 countries/regions/territories.
 Barbie: Life in the City, a YouTube-exclusive web series which debuted on 15 September 2022, primarily focusing on Barbie "Brooklyn" Roberts and expanding her character to emphasize her role and prominence within the brand.

Short films
Mattel produced a number of animated short films featuring Barbie as tie-ins with other titles within the franchise which include as follows:
 Barbie as Sleeping Beauty, a 1999 short film based on the fairy tale released as a TV commercial to supplement a doll line and a video game of the same name. A full-length version supposedly adapting Tchaikovsky's ballet was scrapped in 2009.
 Barbie: A Camping We Will Go, a 2011 short film produced by Technicolor that revolved around Barbie and her sisters to accompany the film, Barbie: A Perfect Christmas.
 Barbie in the Pink Shoes: Land of Sweets, a 2013 short film and Christmas special for Barbie in the Pink Shoes that was first released in German, then was later dubbed in English.
 Barbie and the Nutcracker, a 2021 short film released on YouTube as an episode for Barbie's Dreamworld and, along with a doll line, was part of celebrating the 20th anniversary of the first film, Barbie in the Nutcracker.

Related animations
Aside its eponymous franchise, Mattel also licensed for Barbie to appear in other related animated productions which include as follows:
 Dance! Workout with Barbie, a 1992 30-minute direct-to-video workout tape, featuring Barbie in stop-motion animation by Will Vinton Productions and teaching dance aerobics to real girls.
 Toy Story, a Disney-Pixar film franchise that started in 1995 and featuring Barbie (and later Ken) as supporting characters from Toy Story 2 onwards and its 2011 short film Hawaiian Vacation.
 My Scene, a discontinued franchise launched by Mattel in 2002 and featuring Barbie in its web series and in all of its films, namely: Jammin' in Jamaica and Masquerade Madness in 2004 and My Scene Goes Hollywood in 2005.
 Kelly Dream Club, a 2002 direct-to-video animated series and featuring Barbie as a supporting character to her younger sister, Kelly (renamed Chelsea in 2011).

Cancelled projects

The television specials released in 1987, Barbie and the Rockers: Out of this World and Barbie and the Sensations: Rockin' Back to Earth, were originally pitched as pilot episodes for a Barbie animated series that never materialized owing to the break-down in negotiations between DIC Entertainment and Mattel. The project eventually emerged with a whole new set of characters as Hasbro's Maxie's World in 1988.

In an earlier version of the first Toy Story film, Barbie supposed to have a pivotal role. However, Mattel did not authorize her use to Pixar, as they feared the film would not be successful. Additionally, they wanted to maintain Barbie's neutrality wherein every girl who bought a Barbie doll could imagine her as they wanted, rather than as she was portrayed in a particular film. However, after the success of the first film, multiple Barbie dolls had small roles in Toy Story 2, before the debut of the franchise's definitive iteration in the second sequel.

The 1999 short film commercial, Barbie as Sleeping Beauty, which was released on Nickelodeon as a tie-in to a doll line and video game of the same name, was originally pitched to be a full-length film. In the 2000s, at the peak of classic princess-themed films, Mattel continued to pitch the idea of adapting the fairy tale based on the ballet, completing the adaptations of all three Tchaikovsky's ballets into the franchise. However, it was cancelled without any disclosure on the status of its development while doll lines were released on multiple occasions. Although the reason behind the cancellation is closely linked to The Walt Disney Company being granted to trademark the name "Princess Aurora" and included the acquisition of some of the music (also based on the ballet) for its animated film.

Upcoming projects
Starting with the interactive special film Barbie: Epic Road Trip on 25 October 2022, Mattel signed a long-term deal with Netflix to bring more Barbie programming. This include not only making pre-2017 Barbie films previously held by Universal Pictures available through Netflix, but also producing upcoming projects which include animated specials and series based on Barbie exclusively for the streaming service.

Mattel currently published its upcoming projects on 16 February 2023 that was made available through this link which included a list of more Barbie content, as follows:

Timeline of media appearances
The earliest appearance of Barbie as a media character is her role in the 1987 TV specials where she was voiced by Sharon Lewis. She was voiced by Jodi Benson during her appearances in the Toy Story film franchise. In the Barbie lead-role films, she was voiced by Kelly Sheridan in 27 films altogether. Sheridan was initially succeeded by Diana Kaarina beginning with Barbie: A Fashion Fairytale in 2010, but returned to the role 2 years later with Barbie in A Mermaid Tale 2 and stayed put until Mattel announced Erica Lindbeck as her successor from 2016. The film series was put on a hiatus in 2017 for the shift in focus to the TV series, Barbie: Dreamhouse Adventures, where America Young would replace Lindbeck as the vocal provider for Barbie ahead of the film series resumption in 2020. She was portrayed by Australian actress, Margot Robbie, in the live-action adaptation of the toyline which is set to be released on 21 July 2023.

Reception

Commercial performance 
As of 2013, the films in the franchise has sold over 110 million DVD units worldwide.

In other media

Video games 
Mattel has produced dozens of Barbie video games since the 1980s. These games often are tie-ins with other titles within the franchise.

Books 
Mattel has produced more than 400 books published by multiple authors and publishers based on Barbie since the early 1990s. Every film in the franchise has an eponymous book adaptation.

Comic books 
Mattel has produced a series of comic books about Barbie published by Dell Comics between 1962 and 1963 and Marvel Comics between 1991 and 1996. Since 2016, Papercutz is currently the publisher of graphic novels based on Barbie which are usually tie-ins with other titles within the franchise.

 Barbie and Ken, a 5-issue comic series published by Dell Comics from May 1962 to November 1963.
 Barbie, a 63-issue comic series published by Marvel Comics from January 1991 to March 1996.
 Barbie: Fashion, a 53-issue comic series published by Marvel Comics from January 1991 to May 1995.
 Barbie: Halloween Special, a 2-issue comic series published by Marvel Comics in October 1993.
 Barbie and Baby Sister Kelly, a special one-shot published by Marvel Comics in October 1995.

Albums 
Mattel has released dozens of soundtrack albums and compilation albums based on Barbie since the early 1990s. Most of the films, especially those under the musical genre, are accompanied by their eponymous soundtracks.

 Barbie Sings! The Princess Movie Collection, a soundtrack album released on 5 October 2004 that features music from the first four Barbie films: Barbie in the Nutcracker, Barbie as Rapunzel, Barbie of Swan Lake, and Barbie as the Princess and the Pauper.
 Sing Along with Barbie, a direct-to-video released on 9 November 2009 and a compilation of twelve songs from different Barbie films released at that time that its viewers can sing-along to.

In popular media
On 14 February 2021, film and media podcast, Cult Popture, released an 18-hour episode of Film Franchise Fortnights covering all of the 37 Barbie films released at the time. During the production of the episode, a 38th film was announced.

Notes

References

External links
  (currently a redirect to the Barbie section under Mattel Shop)
 Official Kids' website (merged into a Barbie section under Mattel Kids)

Mass media franchises
Mass media franchises introduced in 1987
Film series introduced in 2001
American film series
Animated film series
Children's film series
American children's animated adventure films
Computer-animated films
Direct-to-video animated films
Direct-to-video film series
Films based on Mattel toys
Films based on fashion dolls
Mattel Creations films
Rainmaker Studios films
Barbie
Barbie films